Chris White is an American multihull sailboat designer.

Career
White built his first trimaran, a Jim Brown designed Searunner 31, in 1973. In the late 1970s he worked with Jim Brown and Dick Newick. His first large design was the 52' trimaran, Juniper, built in southern Virginia and launched in 1981, later sailed around the world by Henk de Velde. In 1983 he started his design business, developing the concept of the forward cockpit or pilot house catamaran. The first of the Atlantic Cats were launched in 1985.

Designs
1981
Juniper
Later 1980s
Discovery 20
Atlantic 50
Atlantic Cats
Atlantic 48
Atlantic 55
Atlantic 57
2010s
Atlantic 47

Books
In 1990 Chris published The Cruising Multihull, which is still in print.

See also
Henk de Velde

References

External links
Chris White Designs

Multihull designers
Living people
American yacht designers
Year of birth missing (living people)